John Esposito Jr (born June 7) is an American businessman and professional poker player who won a  World Series of Poker bracelet in Limit Hold'em.  Esposito has 43 money finishes at the World Series of Poker (WSOP) including eight final tables and seven cashes in the $10,000 No Limit Hold'em Main Event.

Poker career
Esposito has been a regular on the poker tournament circuit since 1985 and has won numerous titles in different poker variants.  He first cashed in the World Series of Poker in 1987 in the $1,500 No Limit Hold'em event and first cashed in the Main Event in 1989, just missing the final table with and 11th place finish.

He won his bracelet with a first place finish in the $2,500 Limit Hold'em at the 1999 World Series of Poker beating out fellow professional Mimi Tran heads-up, earning a cash prize of $219,225.  That final table also included top tournament players T. J. Cloutier and David Chiu.

Esposito also has multiple high finishes in the $10,000 Main Event Championship including 11th in 1989, 12th in 1995, 19th in 1996 26th in 2001, 108th in 2004 and 32nd in the 2011 WSOP.

He has also participated on the World Poker Tour and has cashed in four WPT tournaments.  His highest finish on the WPT so far is an 11th place in the 2004 Poker Million Cruise event.

As of 2019, Esposito's total live tournament winnings exceed $3,650,000  His 43 cashes at the WSOP account for over $1,700,000 of those winnings.

World Series of Poker Bracelet

Notes

American poker players
World Series of Poker bracelet winners
People from the Las Vegas Valley
Living people
Year of birth missing (living people)